Calderón is a Spanish surname.

Calderón may also refer to:

 Calderón (Requena), a village in Valencia, Spain
 Calderón, Quito, a rural parish of Quito Canton, Pichincha Province, Ecuador
 Calderón River, in Mexico
 Vicente Calderón Stadium, Argazuela, Madrid, Spain